Frank Collins (3 February 1903 – 24 July 1988) was an English cricketer. Collins was a right-handed batsman who bowled right-arm medium pace. He was born at Eastbourne, Sussex.

Collins made a single first-class appearance for Sussex against Nottinghamshire at Trent Bridge in the 1923 County Championship. Nottinghamshire won the toss and elected to field first. Put into bat, Sussex made 259 all out in their first-innings, with Collins scoring 27 runs before he was the last man out, dismissed by Len Richmond. Nottinghamshire responded in their first-innings by making 294 all out, with Collins opening the bowling with Henry Roberts. Collins bowled eleven wicketless overs, conceding 33 runs. Sussex then made 169 all out in their second-innings, with Collins once again the last man out, dismissed this time for a duck by Sam Staples. The match ended as a draw. This was his only major appearance for Sussex.

He died at the town of his birth on 24 July 1988.

References

External links
Frank Collins at ESPNcricinfo
Frank Collins at CricketArchive

1903 births
1988 deaths
Sportspeople from Eastbourne
English cricketers
Sussex cricketers